Agnese Cacciola (born August 15, 1972), best known as Neja, is an Italian dance and pop-jazz singer.

Background 
Born in Turin, as a child Cacciola studied piano and, as a teenager, she started singing jazz and gospel. In 1996 she released her first single as Neja, "Hallo", followed in 1998 by "Restless" and "Shock" which both charted in several dance charts across Europe. In 1999 with her song "The Game" she participated in Festivalbar and won the Un disco per l'estate festival.  In 2008,  the album Acousticlub marked a stylistic turn with electronic arrangements replaced by jazz and acoustic sounds. As of 2013, she sold over 4 million records.

Discography
Album 
     1999 - The Game  
     2003 - Hot Stuff  
     2004 - First Flight (EP)
     2008 - AcoustiClub 
     2009 - 133SushiClub 
     2010 - 133SushiClub vol. II 
     2011 - 133SushiClub vol. III  
     2013 - Neja Vù

Singles 

     1997 - "Hallo"
     1998 - "Restless"
     1998 - "Shock!"
     1999 - "The Game"
     2000 - "Fairytale"
     2000 - "Singin' Nanana"
     2000 - "Mum's Day"
     2001 - "Time Flies"
     2001 - "Back 4 the Morning"
     2002 - "Looking 4 Something"
     2003 - "Hot Stuff"
     2003 - "To the Music"
     2005 - "Who's Gonna Be?"
     2007 - "Catwalk"
     2008 - "Sweet Dreams"
     2009 - "Loving You" (WAG011 feat. Neja)
     2010 - "Sorry" (Lanfranchi & Farina feat. Neja)
     2011 - "Walking on a Dream" (O2 feat. Neja)
     2012 - "Sun has come again"
     2013 - "The Role of Love"

Chart history

References

External links
  
 

1972 births
Musicians from Turin
Living people
Eurodance musicians
Italian dance musicians
21st-century Italian singers
21st-century Italian women singers